Ivan Karić (born 19 September 1975) is a politician in Serbia. He is the leader of the Greens of Serbia and served in the National Assembly of Serbia from 2012 to 2017, when he was appointed as a state secretary in the country's ministry of environmental protection.

Early life and career
Karić was born in the Belgrade municipality of Obrenovac, in what was then the Socialist Republic of Serbia in the Socialist Federal Republic of Yugoslavia. He is a graduate of the University of Belgrade Faculty of Mining and Geology, was the deputy director of Obrenovac's Environmental Protection Fund from 2004 to 2008, and was head of flood security at JVP Beogrаdvode from 2009 to 2010.He is married and have 14 year old son Dusan. His wife name is Sandra.

Politician
Karić led a electoral list called Green Obrenovac in the 2008 Serbian local elections, running for election to the Obrenovac municipal assembly. The list did not cross the electoral threshold to win mandates in the assembly.

He was first elected to the National Assembly of Serbia in the 2012 Serbian parliamentary election. The Greens of Serbia contested this election as part of the Choice for a Better Life coalition led by Boris Tadić's Democratic Party, and Karić received the fifty-second position on its electoral list. The list won sixty-seven mandates, and Karić was duly elected as the sole parliamentary representative of his party. The election was won by the Serbian Progressive Party and its allies, and Karić served in opposition.

Karić urged the Serbian government to extend the country's moratorium on nuclear power in late 2012, after the president of the Serbian Academy of Sciences and Arts said that the moratorium would be reviewed in three years' time. Karić was quoted as saying on the matter, "Japan has perhaps the most advanced technology [in the world], but even this technology could not stand up to the earthquake and the tsunami. Nuclear power plants in Europe go through rigorous tests and most of them would not withstand a serious earthquake." He later said that Serbia should defer talks to join the World Trade Organization (WTO) rather than succumbing to pressure from that organization to overturn a national ban on genetically modified foods.

The Democratic Party split in early 2014, with Tadić leading a breakaway faction. As there was no time for him to register his new party before the 2014 parliamentary election, his group agreed to join the Green Party, which was renamed as the "New Democratic Party – Greens." This party, in turn, participated in the 2014 election on a coalition list under Tadić's leadership. Karić received the thirteenth position on the list and was re-elected when the list won eighteen mandates. Although the Greens once again became a separate party after the election, Karić sat with Tadic's Social Democratic Party parliamentary group in the parliament that followed.

In February 2016, Karić left the Social Democratic Party caucus to join that of the Socialist Party of Serbia. The Greens contested the 2016 parliamentary election on the Socialist Party's list; Karić received the ninth position and was easily returned when the list won twenty-nine mandates. He continued to sit in the Socialist caucus after the election and, as the Socialists participated in Serbia's coalition government, was a member of its parliamentary majority.

Following the 2016 election, Karić was a member of the parliamentary environmental protection committee; a deputy member of the European integration committee and the committee on spatial planning, transport, infrastructure, and telecommunications; a deputy of member of Serbia's delegation to the Parliamentary Assembly of the Organization for Security and Co-operation in Europe; the leader of its parliamentary friendship group with Norway; and a member of its parliamentary friendship groups with Australia, Austria, Canada, China, Denmark, Germany, Greece, Iran, the Netherlands, and South Africa. There were rumours that Karić would contest the 2017 Serbian presidential election, though ultimately this did not happen.

He resigned from the assembly on October 10, 2017, after being appointed as a state secretary in Serbia's ministry of environmental protection.

References

1975 births
Living people
Politicians from Belgrade
Members of the National Assembly (Serbia)
Deputy Members of the Parliamentary Assembly of the Organization for Security and Co-operation in Europe
Greens of Serbia politicians